Chicago Lawn, also signed as Chicago Lawn-63rd St., was a former railroad station on the border of Chicago Lawn and West Lawn in Chicago, Illinois. The tracks adjacent to the station were elevated over 63rd Street in 1929. Service to the station remained until April 30, 1971, when the eastbound International Limited and westbound Inter-City Limited passenger trains were replaced by Amtrak services on May 1, 1971. The station building was demolished in 2017.

References

External links
Chicago, IL Depot: GTW Chicago Lawn Depot - Blogspot

Former railway stations in Illinois
Railway stations in Chicago
Railway stations closed in 1971
Former Grand Trunk Western Railroad stations